As One is a South Korean R&B girl group consisting of Korean-American singers Lee Min and Crystal. The group debuted in 1999 with the album Day by Day, and released five more albums before announcing their hiatus from the music industry in 2017 with the single, "Goodbye for Now".

History 
Their first hit was the song "너만은 모르길" (Only You Wouldn't Know), released in 1999 by Rock Records. Between their fourth and fifth albums, their contract with Rock Records expired and they signed with EMI Music Publishing Korea; a label which also manages other K-pop stars like DJ DOC and Baby V.O.X.

In late 2006, As One released their fifth album 12 Tears of Farewell, and started their promotional activities with the lead track "십이야" (12 Nights).

They are currently under the management of Brand New Music and they host a radio show called K-Popular on TBS eFM radio.

In contrast to their usual style, As One released a 19+ rated music video ahead of their October 29, 2014 release date for the single "오늘같은 날" (For the Night). The music video featured labelmate Jae Woong from 4-member hip hop group Troy and fitness model Kim Hae Na.

On June 20, 2016, As One made a comeback with a new single titled "The Pain I Caused". The song is from their sixth album Outlast, which was released on June 21, 2016. The album features ten tracks along with the lead single, "Don't Say Anything", which was released June 21, 2016.

The pair appeared on JTBC's Sugarman 3 on December 13, 2019.

Discography

Studio albums

Compilation and live albums

Extended plays

Singles

Collaborative singles

Soundtrack appearances

Awards

References 

South Korean musical duos
South Korean girl groups
South Korean contemporary R&B musical groups
K-pop music groups
Brand New Music artists
Musical groups established in 1999
1999 establishments in South Korea
Pop music duos
Contemporary R&B duos
Female musical duos